Crassula muscosa,  synonyms Crassula lycopodioides and Crassula pseudolycopodioides, is a succulent plant native to South Africa and Namibia, belonging to the family of Crassulaceae and to the genus Crassula. It is a houseplant grown worldwide and commonly known as rattail crassula, watch chain, lizard's tail, zipper plant and princess pines.

Etymology
The scientific and the common names refer to its appearance: muscosa derives from the Latin word muscosus, meaning "mossy". Lycopodioides, referred to the clubmoss Lycopodium, derives from the Greek words "Λύκος" (líkos, wolf), "πόδι" (pódi, foot) and οειδής (oeides, -oid, similar to).

Description
Crassula muscosa has very small, light green leaves that are densely packed around a thin stem, and the arrangement of the leaves around the stems gives them a square shape. It grows as an intricate bush with very small yellow-green flowers, with a maximum height of 15–20 cm.

Distribution and habitat
Crassula muscosa is native to South Africa (the Cape Provinces, the Free State and the Northern Provinces) and Namibia. It grows in environments with a moderate degree of humidity, in which the soil is well drained and composed of fertile soil and sand.

Cultivation
During the cold season, it tolerates temperature drops up to a minimum of 6-8°C, requiring little water. In summer, it needs a lot more water and should be not exposed to full sun, as it suffers under excessive sunlight. When these conditions are not met the plant begins to dry and stiffen, generally starting from the base of the stem up to the tips. It is an invasive species and easily propagated from stem cuttings. If the environment maintains a stable temperature of 20-21°C, with adequate humidity and brightness, the cutting will root and grow rapidly.

Gallery

Varieties

Crassula muscosa var. accuminata
Crassula muscosa var. muscosa
Crassula lycopodioides var. purpusii
Crassula muscosa var. rastafarii
Crassula muscosa var. sinuata
Crassula muscosa var. variegata

References

External links

Crassula muscosa at learn2grow.com

Muscosa
Flora of the Cape Provinces
Flora of the Free State
Flora of the Northern Provinces
Flora of Namibia
Garden plants
House plants